BUPS or Bups may refer to:

 Bilkent University Preparatory School, now Bilkent Laboratory and International School, in Turkey  
 BUPS (Beacon Ultra Portable S-band), a type of World War II electronic warfare equipment
 "Bups", a song by Papa M from the 1999 album Live from a Shark Cage
 Bups Saggu is a British Bhangra DJ